Maria Lucette Rådström, (born 3 December 1974) is a Swedish journalist and television presenter. She has worked for TV4 since 1998, she started her career at ZTV as a presenter for Efter plugget along with Mårten Andersson between 1997 and 1998. She has presented the New Year's Eve celebrations at TV4 along with Rickard Sjöberg in 1998, and  Josefin Crafoord in 2005. In 1999 Rådström participated as a "tracking dog" in the game show På rymmen along with Hasse Aro.

Lucette Rådström has also presented the kids show Lattjo Lajban on TV4 with Tobbe Blom, and in 2002 she competed in Gladiatorerna in a special celebrity edition.

References

External links

Living people
1974 births
Place of birth missing (living people)
Swedish television personalities
Swedish women television presenters
Swedish women journalists
20th-century Swedish journalists
21st-century Swedish journalists